The black rat (Rattus rattus), also known as the roof rat, ship rat, or house rat, is a common long-tailed rodent of the stereotypical rat genus Rattus, in the subfamily Murinae. It likely originated in the Indian subcontinent, but is now found worldwide.

The black rat is black to light brown in colour with a lighter underside. It is a generalist omnivore and a serious pest to farmers because it feeds on a wide range of agricultural crops. It is sometimes kept as a pet. In parts of India, it is considered sacred and respected in the Karni Mata Temple in Deshnoke.

Taxonomy
Mus rattus was the scientific name proposed by Carl Linnaeus in 1758 for the black rat.

Three subspecies were once recognized, but today are considered invalid and are now known to be actually color morphs:
Rattus rattus rattus – roof rat
Rattus rattus alexandrinus – Alexandrine rat
Rattus rattus frugivorus – fruit rat

Characteristics

Despite its name, the black rat exhibits several colour forms. It is usually black to light brown in colour with a lighter underside. In England during the 1920s, several variations were bred and shown alongside domesticated brown rats. This included an unusual green-tinted variety. The black rat also has a scraggly coat of black fur, and is slightly smaller than the brown rat.

Origin
Black rat bone remains dating to the Norman period were discovered in Great Britain. The black rat occurred in prehistoric Europe and in the Levant during postglacial periods. The black rat in the Mediterranean region differs genetically from its South Asian ancestor by having 38 instead of 42 chromosomes. Its closest relative is the Asian house rat (R. tanezumi) from Southeast Asia. The two diverged about 120,000 years ago in southwest Asia. It is unclear how the rat made its way to Europe due to insufficient data, although a land route seems more likely based on the distribution of European haplogroup "A". The rat spread throughout Europe with the Roman conquest, but declined around the 6th century – possibly due to collapse of the Roman grain trade, climate cooling, or the Justinianic Plague. A genetically different rat population (still haplogroup A) replaced the Roman population in the medieval times in Europe.

It is a resilient vector for many diseases because of its ability to hold so many infectious bacteria in its blood. It was formerly thought to have played a primary role in spreading bacteria contained in fleas on its body, such as the plague bacterium (Yersinia pestis) which is responsible for the Plague of Justinian and the Black Death. However, recent studies have called this theory into question and instead posit humans themselves as the vector, as the movements of the epidemics and the black rat populations do not show historical or geographical correspondence. A study published in 2015 indicates that other Asiatic rodents served as plague reservoirs, from which infections spread as far west as Europe via trade routes, both overland and maritime. Although the black rat was certainly a plague vector in European ports, the spread of the plague beyond areas colonized by rats suggests that the plague was also circulated by humans after reaching Europe.

Diet
Black rats are considered omnivores and eat a wide range of foods, including seeds, fruit, stems, leaves, fungi, and a variety of invertebrates and vertebrates. They are generalists, and thus not very specific in their food preferences, which is indicated by their tendency to feed on any meal provided for cows, swine, chickens, cats, and dogs. They are similar to the tree squirrel in their preference of fruits and nuts. Their diet is high in water content. They are a threat to many natural habitats because they feed on birds and insects. They are also a threat to many farmers, since they feed on a variety of agricultural-based crops, such as cereals, sugar cane, coconuts, cocoa, oranges, and coffee beans.

Distribution and habitat
The black rat originated in India and Southeast Asia, and spread to the Near East and Egypt, and then throughout the Roman Empire, reaching Great Britain as early as the 1st century AD. Europeans subsequently spread it throughout the world. The black rat is again largely confined to warmer areas, having been supplanted by the brown rat (Rattus norvegicus) in cooler regions and urban areas. In addition to the brown rat being larger and more aggressive, the change from wooden structures and thatched roofs to bricked and tiled buildings favored the burrowing brown rats over the arboreal black rats. In addition, brown rats eat a wider variety of foods, and are more resistant to weather extremes.

Black rat populations can increase exponentially under certain circumstances, perhaps having to do with the timing of the fruiting of the bamboo plant, and cause devastation to the plantings of subsistence farmers; this phenomenon is known as mautam in parts of India.

Black rats are thought to have arrived in Australia with the First Fleet, and subsequently spread to many coastal regions in the country.

Black rats adapt to a wide range of habitats. In urban areas they are found around warehouses, residential buildings, and other human settlements. They are also found in agricultural areas, such as in barns and crop fields. In urban areas, they prefer to live in dry upper levels of buildings, so they are commonly found in wall cavities and false ceilings. In the wild, black rats live in cliffs, rocks, the ground, and trees. They are great climbers and prefer to live in palms and trees, such as pine trees. Their nests are typically spherical and made of shredded material, including sticks, leaves, other vegetation, and cloth. In the absence of palms or trees, they can burrow into the ground. Black rats are also found around fences, ponds, riverbanks, streams, and reservoirs.

Behaviour and ecology
It is thought that male and female rats have similarly sized home ranges during the winter, but male rats increase the size of their home range during the breeding season. Along with differing between rats of different sex, home range also differs depending on the type of forest in which the black rat inhabits. For example, home ranges in the southern beech forests of the South Island, New Zealand appear to be much larger than the non-beech forests of the North Island. Due to the limited number of rats that are studied in home range studies, the estimated sizes of rat home ranges in different rat demographic groups are inconclusive.

Nesting behaviour
Through the usage of tracking devices such as radio transmitters, rats have been found to occupy dens located in trees, as well as on the ground. In Puketi Forest in the Northland Region of New Zealand, rats have been found to form dens together. Rats appear to den and forage in separate areas in their home range depending on the availability of food resources. Research shows that, in New South Wales, the black rat prefers to inhabit lower leaf litter of forest habitat. There is also an apparent correlation between the canopy height and logs and the presence of black rats. This correlation may be a result of the distribution of the abundance of prey as well as available refuges for rats to avoid predators. As found in North Head, New South Wales, there is positive correlation between rat abundance, leaf litter cover, canopy height, and litter depth. All other habitat variables showed little to no correlation. While this species' relative, the brown (Norway) rat prefers to nest near the ground of a building the black rat will prefer the upper floors and roof. Because of this habit they have been given the common name roof rat.

Foraging behaviour
The black rat displays flexibility in its foraging behaviour. It is a predatory species and adapts to different micro-habitats. It often meets and forages together in close proximity within and between sexes. It tends to forage after sunset. If the food cannot be eaten quickly, it searches for a place to carry and hoard to eat at a later time. Although it eats a broad range of foods, it is a highly selective feeder; only a restricted selection of the foods is dominating. When offered a wide diversity of foods, it eats only a small sample of each. This allows it to monitor the quality of foods that are present year round, such as leaves, as well as seasonal foods, such as herbs and insects. This method of operating on a set of foraging standards ultimately determines the final composition of its meals. Also, by sampling the available food in an area, it maintains a dynamic food supply, balance its nutrient intake, and avoids intoxication by secondary compounds.

Diseases
Black rats (or their ectoparasites) can carry a number of pathogens, of which bubonic plague (via the Oriental rat flea), typhus, Weil's disease, toxoplasmosis and trichinosis are the best known. It has been hypothesized that the displacement of black rats by brown rats led to the decline of the Black Death. This theory has, however, been deprecated, as the dates of these displacements do not match the increases and decreases in plague outbreaks.

Rats serve as outstanding vectors for transmittance of diseases because they can carry bacteria and viruses in their systems. A number of bacterial diseases are common to rats, and these include Streptococcus pneumoniae, Corynebacterium kutsheri, Bacillus piliformis, Pasteurella pneumotropica, and Streptobacillus moniliformis, to name a few. All of these bacteria are disease causing agents in humans. In some cases, these diseases are incurable.

Predators
The black rat is prey to cats and owls in domestic settings. In less urban settings, rats are preyed on by weasels, foxes, and coyotes. These predators have little effect on the control of the black rat population because black rats are agile and fast climbers. In addition to agility, the black rat also uses its keen sense of hearing to detect danger and quickly evade mammalian and avian predators.

As an invasive species

Damage caused
After Rattus rattus was introduced into the northern islands of New Zealand, they fed on the seedlings, adversely affecting the ecology of the islands. Even after eradication of R. rattus, the negative effects may take decades to reverse. When consuming these seabirds and seabird eggs, these rats reduce the pH of the soil. This harms plant species by reducing nutrient availability in soil, thus decreasing the probability of seed germination. For example, research conducted by Hoffman et al. indicates a large impact on 16 indigenous plant species directly preyed on by R. rattus. These plants displayed a negative correlation in germination and growth in the presence of black rats.
Rats prefer to forage in forest habitats. In the Ogasawara islands, they prey on the indigenous snails and seedlings. Snails that inhabit the leaf litter of these islands showed a significant decline in population on the introduction of Rattus rattus. The black rat shows a preference for snails with larger shells (greater than 10 mm), and this led to a great decline in the population of snails with larger shells. A lack of prey refuges makes it more difficult for the snail to avoid the rat.

Complex pest
The black rat is a complex pest, defined as one that influences the environment in both harmful and beneficial ways. In many cases, after the black rat is introduced into a new area, the population size of some native species declines or goes extinct. This is because the black rat is a good generalist with a wide dietary niche and a preference for complex habitats; this causes strong competition for resources among small animals. This has led to the black rat completely displacing many native species in Madagascar, the Galapagos, and the Florida Keys. In a study by Stokes et al., habitats suitable for the native bush rat, Rattus fuscipes, of Australia are often invaded by the black rat and are eventually occupied by only the black rat. When the abundances of these two rat species were compared in different micro-habitats, both were found to be affected by micro-habitat disturbances, but the black rat was most abundant in areas of high disturbance; this indicates it has a better dispersal ability.

Despite the black rat's tendency to displace native species, it can also aid in increasing species population numbers and maintaining species diversity. The bush rat, a common vector for spore dispersal of truffles, has been extirpated from many micro-habitats of Australia. In the absence of a vector, the diversity of truffle species would be expected to decline. In a study in New South Wales, Australia it was found that, although the bush rat consumes a diversity of truffle species, the black rat consumes as much of the diverse fungi as the natives and is an effective vector for spore dispersal. Since the black rat now occupies many of the micro-habitats that were previously inhabited by the bush rat, the black rat plays an important ecological role in the dispersal of fungal spores. By eradicating the black rat populations in Australia, the diversity of fungi would decline, potentially doing more harm than good.

Control methods
Large-scale rat control programs have been taken to maintain a steady level of the invasive predators in order to conserve the native species in New Zealand such as kokako and mohua. Pesticides, such as pindone and 1080 (sodium fluoroacetate), are commonly distributed via aerial spray by helicopter as a method of mass control on islands infested with invasive rat populations. Bait, such as brodifacoum, is also used along with coloured dyes (used to deter birds from eating the baits) in order to kill and identify rats for experimental and tracking purposes. Another method to track rats is the use of wired cage traps, which are used along with bait, such as rolled oats and peanut butter, to tag and track rats to determine population sizes through methods like mark-recapture and radio-tracking. Tracking tunnels (coreflute tunnels containing an inked card) are also commonly used monitoring devices, as are chew-cards containing peanut butter. Poison control methods are effective in reducing rat populations to nonthreatening sizes, but rat populations often rebound to normal size within months. Besides their highly adaptive foraging behavior and fast reproduction, the exact mechanisms for their rebound is unclear and are still being studied.

In 2010, the Sociedad Ornitológica Puertorriqueña (Puerto Rican Bird Society) and the Ponce Yacht and Fishing Club launched a campaign to eradicate the black rat from the Isla Ratones (Mice Island) and Isla Cardona (Cardona Island) islands off the municipality of Ponce, Puerto Rico.

Decline in population
Rattus rattus populations were common in Great Britain, but began to decline after the introduction of the brown rat in the 18th century. R. rattus populations remained common in seaports and major cities until the late 19th century, but have been decreased due to rodent control and sanitation measures. The Shiant Islands in the Outer Hebrides in Scotland are often cited as the last remaining wild population of R. rattus left in Britain but evidence demonstrates that populations survive on other islands (e.g. Inchcolm) and in localised areas of the British mainland.  Recent National Biodiversity Network data show populations around the U.K., particularly in ports and port towns.

As of winter 2015 the Shiant Isles Recovery Project (a joint initiative between RSPB and Scottish Natural Heritage) is underway to eradicate Rattus rattus populations on the islands.

See also

 Karni Mata Temple, Deshnoke, Rajasthan, India.
 Polynesian rat
 Urban plague

References

Further reading
 List of books and articles about rats

External links

Photos and video at ARKive

Rattus
Rodents of Asia
Rodents of Europe
Mammals of Azerbaijan
Mammals of Nepal
Stored-product pests
Mammals described in 1758
Taxa named by Carl Linnaeus
Invasive animal species in Australia